CW4 may refer to any of the following:

Television stations in the United States affiliated with The CW

Current
 KCWO-TV in Big Spring / Odessa / Midland, Texas
 KTIV-DT2 in Sioux City, Iowa
 KTKB-LD in Tamuning, Guam (cable channel; broadcasts on channel 26)
 KXLF-TV-DT2 in Butte, Montana
 WCBI-TV-DT3 in Columbus, Mississippi
 WMOW in Wausau, Wisconsin
 WOAI-DT2 in San Antonio, Texas

Former
 WTTV in Bloomington / Indianapolis, Indiana (CW affiliated from 2006 to 2014)

Other uses
 CW4, a postcode district in the CW postcode area
 Chief Warrant Officer 4, a rank of Warrant Officer (United States) in the United States military
 HLA-Cw4 is a serotype within the HLA-C serotype group